Alistipes is a Gram-negative genus of rod-shaped anaerobic bacteria in the phylum Bacteroidota. When members of this genus colonize the human gastrointestinal (GI) tract, they provide protective effects against colitis (intestinal inflammation), autism, and cirrhosis (liver fibrosis). However, this genus can also cause dysbiosis by contributing to anxiety, chronic fatigue syndrome, depression, and hypertension. Showcasing priority effects in microbiome assembly, when infant GI tracts have bacteria of the species Staphylococcus but not the species Faecalibacterium, Alistipes species become less capable of colonization.

Etymology
Alistipes is derived from the New Latin noun alistipes, meaning "the other stick", which is further derived from the Latin adjective alius (other) and noun stipes (log/post).

Species
This genus has eleven validly published species, as per the International Code of Nomenclature of Prokaryotes (ICNP):
 Alistipes communis Sakamoto et al. 2020
 Alistipes dispar Sakamoto et al. 2020
 Alistipes finegoldii Rautio et al. 2003
 Alistipes hominis Liu et al. 2022
 Alistipes ihumii Pfleiderer et al. 2017
 Alistipes indistinctus Nagai et al. 2010
 Alistipes inops Shkoporov et al. 2015
 Alistipes onderdonkii Song et al. 2006
 Alistipes putredinis (Weinberg et al. 1937) Rautio et al. 2003
 Alistipes shahii Song et al. 2006
 Alistipes timonensis Lagier et al. 2014

See also 
 Bacterial taxonomy
 Microbiology

References 

Bacteria genera
Bacteroidia